O. fenestrata may refer to:
 Ocenebra fenestrata, the fenestrate oyster drill, a sea snail species in the genus Ocenebra found in South Africa
 Oliva fenestrata, Röding, 1798, a sea snail species in the genus Oliva
 Ortalis fenestrata, a picture-winged fly species

See also
 Fenestrata (disambiguation)